Barbitistes is a genus of bush crickets in the subfamily Phaneropterinae.

Description
In the genus Barbitistes the anterior dorsal surface of the vertex (fastigium) is usually conical and blunt. The length of the antenna is approximately 1.5 - 3 fold to body length. The males have long and often tortuous appendages on the rear-most segments ("cerci"). The Barbitistes species are often brightly colored.

Distribution
Species of this genus are present in much of Europe (but not the British Isles or Scandinavia) and in Asia Minor.

Species
This genus contains the following species:

 Barbitistes berenguieri Fagniez, 1935
 Barbitistes brunneri Pancic, 1883
 Barbitistes constrictus Brunner von Wattenwyl, 1878
 Barbitistes fischeri (Yersin, 1854) 
 Barbitistes kaltenbachi Harz, 1965
 Barbitistes obtusus Targioni-Tozzetti, 1881
 Barbitistes ocskayi (Charpentier, 1850) 
 Barbitistes serricauda (Fabricius, 1798) 
 Barbitistes vicetinus Galvagni & Fontana, 1993
 Barbitistes yersini Brunner, 1878

References

Phaneropterinae
Ensifera genera